Asier Benito Sasiain (born 11 February 1995) is a Spanish professional footballer who plays for Greek Super League club Asteras Tripolis as a forward.

Career 
Benito was born in Amurrio, Álava, Basque Country. He finished his formation with CD Aurrerá de Vitoria, and made his senior debuts in the 2012–13 campaign, in Tercera División.

In 2013 Benito moved to Deportivo Alavés, being assigned to the reserves also in the fourth tier. On 17 June 2014, he renewed his link for a further year. On 13 March 2016, Benito made his professional debut, coming on as a late substitute for Gaizka Toquero in a 1–3 away loss against CA Osasuna in the Segunda División championship.

In 2017, he became involved in a contractual dispute with Alavés, subsequently transferring to another reserve team, Bilbao Athletic in Segunda División B. The move allowed him to easily continue his studies at the University of Deusto while continuing as a player.

On 2 July 2019, Benito signed a three-year deal with SD Eibar, but was loaned to second division side SD Ponferradina on 6 August. He scored his first professional goal on 5 October, netting his team's second in a 2–0 home win against CD Mirandés.

On 8 September 2020, Benito agreed to a one-year loan deal with CD Numancia, freshly relegated to the third division.

Personal life
Benito's elder brother, Ander, is also a footballer. A defender, he was groomed at Amurrio Club.

Career statistics

Club

Honours
Alavés
Segunda División: 2015–16

References

External links

1995 births
Living people
Sportspeople from Álava
Spanish footballers
Spanish expatriate footballers
Spanish expatriate sportspeople in Greece
Expatriate footballers in Greece
Footballers from the Basque Country (autonomous community)
Association football forwards
Segunda División players
Segunda División B players
Tercera División players
Super League Greece players
Deportivo Alavés B players
Deportivo Alavés players
Bilbao Athletic footballers
SD Eibar footballers
SD Ponferradina players
CD Numancia players
CD Aurrerá de Vitoria footballers
Asteras Tripolis F.C. players